The Wollongong High School of the Performing Arts is a government-funded co-educational comprehensive and specialist secondary day school with speciality in performing arts, located in Fairy Meadow, a suburb of Wollongong, New South Wales, Australia.

Established in 1916, the school enrolled approximately 1,190 students in 2018, from Year 7 to Year 12, of whom five percent identified as Indigenous Australians and 25 per cent were from a language background other than English. The school is operated by the NSW Department of Education.

Approximately one-third of students gain entry through auditions. The school focuses primarily on academic excellence and excellence in the performing arts and has examination results well above average and a high level of tertiary acceptance.

History
The school was established in 1916 in Smith Street Wollongong as Wollongong Home Science School, for girls only. At the time it was the only high school between Sydney and the Victorian border.

Notable alumni

 Natalie BassingthwaighteAustralian singer and actress
 Ashley Fisherformer Tennis player
 Nicholas Cowdery former New South Wales Director of Public Prosecutions
 Mark KerryOlympic gold medalist in swimming
 Stephen Martinformer politician
 Evelyn OwenInventor
 Mary Puckeyfirst female superintendent of an Australian hospital
 Leigh Joel ScottAustralian writer and actor
 DPR IanKorean-Australian singer, rapper and director

See also 

 List of government schools in New South Wales
 List of creative and performing arts high schools in New South Wales
 List of selective high schools in New South Wales

References

External links

Educational institutions established in 1916
1916 establishments in Australia
Creative and performing arts high schools in New South Wales
Schools in Wollongong
Public high schools in New South Wales
Fairy Meadow, New South Wales